"She's Attracted To" is a song by English indie rock band Young Knives and is featured on their second studio album, Voices of Animals and Men. The third single taken from the album, it was released on 19 June 2006 and reached a peak position of #38 in the UK Singles Chart.

Track listing

CD:

"She's Attracted To" – 3:06
"Two Places"

2006 singles
2006 songs
Transgressive Records singles